The University of Baguio Science High School (UBSHS) is a private, nonsectarian science high school. It is the science department of the University of Baguio and was founded in 1963, predating the Philippine Science High School which was established in 1964. The school is considered a pioneer among private science high schools in Asia.

History

In 1963, a special examination was administered to sixth grade students from the City. The passers of this exam was put in a Special Science Scholars Section or SSSS. This promulgated an annual scholarship examination that formally established the UB Science High School as an institution of specialized secondary education. The school's pioneer batch graduated in 1967.

In 1970, the school received its legal recognition.

In lieu of the implementation of the Aquino Administration's K to 12 program in 2013, the school has since established the Senior High School department which offers the following strands under the Academic Track: (1) Science, Technology, Engineering & Mathematics (STEM) (2) Accountancy, Business & Management (ABM), and Humanities & Social Sciences (HUMMS).

References

External links
University of Baguio official website

Private schools in the Philippines
Science high schools in the Philippines
University-affiliated schools in the Philippines
Schools in Baguio